The Sippican River ("long river") is a short river in Massachusetts, United States.

Each branch flows through a complex system of cranberry bogs and reservoirs, and empties a short distance away through Wareham into Buzzards Bay near the Weweantic River mouth.

As of 2006, efforts are underway to restore the native alewife population to the river.

References

Marion, Massachusetts
Rochester, Massachusetts
Wareham, Massachusetts
Rivers of Plymouth County, Massachusetts
Rivers of Massachusetts